Garry Lindsey Thompson (born 7 October 1959) is an English former professional footballer and manager who made over 480 appearances in the Football League, most notably for Coventry City, West Bromwich Albion and Aston Villa. After his retirement as a player, Thompson moved into coaching and management.

Playing career 
A forward, Thompson had a long playing career and club level, making 487 appearances and scoring 124 goals in the Premier League and throughout the Football League. His peak years were earlier in his career with Coventry City, for whom he scored 49 goals in 158 appearances and West Bromwich Albion, for whom he was voted the club's 1984–85 Player of the Year. Late in the 1989–90 season Thompson joined Crystal Palace to provide cover for the injured Ian Wright, but was cup-tied for the 1990 FA Cup Final. He briefly played in the Premier League for Queens Park Rangers during the 1992–93 season and made one European appearance for Cardiff City in September 1993. Thompson retired at the end of the 1996–97 season and finished his career with 584 appearances and 153 goals.

Managerial and coaching career

Bristol Rovers 
Thompson began his coaching career while still a player at Northampton Town and later moved to Bristol Rovers as a coach and reserve team manager. In January 2001, after the sacking of manager Ian Holloway, he was named in caretaker charge and managed the first team until the end of the 2000–01 Second Division season and was unable to prevent the Gas' relegation to the Third Division. Thompson became assistant to new manager Gerry Francis in June 2001 and after Francis' resignation in December 2001, he took over the role as permanent manager on a -year contract. By 9 April 2002 and with a double relegation into non-League football looking likely, Thompson was sacked.

Brentford 
In October 2002, Thompson was named as assistant to manager Wally Downes at Second Division club Brentford. He continued in the role until 15 March 2004, when, with the prospect of relegation looming, Downes was sacked. Thompson was named caretaker manager and his one match in charge resulted in a 1–1 draw with Blackpool the following night. He left the club following the appointment of Martin Allen on 18 March.

Farnborough Town 
Thompson served as a coach at struggling Conference Premier club Farnborough Town during the 2004–05 season and quit the club on 31 March 2005.

Hucknall Town 
In February 2006, Thompson joined Conference North club Hucknall Town as assistant to manager Kevin Wilson. He was released from his contract in December 2006.

Personal life 
Thompson is of Saint Kitts and Nevis descent. His younger brother Keith was also a professional footballer and he is the uncle of athlete Daniel Caines. Thompson is an Aston Villa supporter and has worked in PR, as a driver and as a summariser for BBC WM. He released an autobiography, Don't Believe a Word, in December 2020.

Honours 
Aston Villa
 Football League Second Division second-place promotion: 1987–88

Individual

West Bromwich Albion Player of the Year: 1984–85

Career statistics

Player

Manager

References

External links

Garry Thompson at premierleague.com

1959 births
Living people
Footballers from Birmingham, West Midlands
Association football forwards
English footballers
England under-21 international footballers
English Football League players
Premier League players
Coventry City F.C. players
West Bromwich Albion F.C. players
Sheffield Wednesday F.C. players
Aston Villa F.C. players
Watford F.C. players
Crystal Palace F.C. players
Queens Park Rangers F.C. players
Cardiff City F.C. players
Northampton Town F.C. players
English football managers
Bristol Rovers F.C. managers
Brentford F.C. managers
Northampton Town F.C. non-playing staff
English people of Saint Kitts and Nevis descent